Hradec Králové Airport is a public domestic and private international airport located about 3 km (1 mi) from Hradec Králové, in east Bohemia, Czech Republic in the town of Hradec Králové. There are currently no scheduled commercial flights operating to or from the airport, although it is sometimes visited by private jet traffic. The airport can handle all aircraft categories.

In the 2010 was visited by Boeing 737-300 of Czech Connect Airlines on the VFR base training.

For many years is the LKHK base for Open Skies for Handicapped in June and Czech International Air Festival in September.

Project IFR LKHK 2015 
The airport is now under certification process to obtain certification for IFR AFIS with RNAV / GNSS non-precision approach.

Statistics
In 2017 had Airport Hradec Kralove about 77 376 movements.

 ACFT – 72 763
 ACFT INTL – 785
 ULL – 4 614
 ULL INTL – 134

Ground transportation
DPMHK, the Hradec Hradec Kralove Public Transit Co., operates a bus which stops at the station called "Airport (Letiště)", which is a 10-minute walk from the private area of the airport

The airport is a few kilometers away from the highway (D11) to Prague.

 To Prague approx. 50 min.
 To Náchod approx. 45 min. (border crossing CZ-PL)
 To Deštné v Orlických horách approx. 70 min. (Ski resort, Orlické hory - Eagle Mountains)
 To Pec pod Sněžkou approx. 75 min. (Ski resort, Krkonoše - Giant Mountains)
 To Kvasiny approx. 50 min. (Škoda Auto a.s. factory)

Events

 Czech International Air Festival
 Open Skies for Handicapped
 European Festival of Aviation (European Helicopter Show)

The Rock for People and Hip Hop Camp festivals are held in the public area of airport in the festival park.
 In 2010, UK band Muse touched down at the airport in a Fairchild Dornier 328JET

Information 

Fire category 2. CAT 3 - 7 on request 24hrs before.
 VFR day/night, fuelling: on request 24 hours in advance Avgas 100LL, Jet fuel-A1 (pressure and gravity)
 Flying schools operated from this airport: DSA a.s., HELI Czech s.r.o., Lion Helicopters s.r.o. etc.
 Aircraft and helicopter maintenance services are located here too.
 Aircraft manufacturer TL Ultralight

Gallery

References

Photos from Airport Hradec Králové on planes.cz
Web of airport (Ground handling request, weather, AIP, etc.)
Project LKHK IFR started (Czech language)
Czech International Air Festival (CIAF)

External links

Airports in the Czech Republic
Airports
1929 establishments in Czechoslovakia
Airports established in 1929
20th-century architecture in the Czech Republic